Pantolia flavomarginata is a species of beetles belonging the family Scarabaeidae.

Distribution
This species is present in Madagascar.

References

Cetoniinae
Beetles described in 1833